Viuuulentemente mia ("Mine with violence") is a 1982 Italian crime comedy film written and directed by Carlo Vanzina.

Cast 
 Diego Abatantuono as Achille Cotone
 Laura Antonelli as Anna Tassotti Maloni
 Christian De Sica as Juan Lopez y Aragona de Figeroa
 Guido Nicheli as Rodolfo
 Jackie Basehart as Frank Lovejoy
 Diego Cappuccio as Achille's Colleague
 Sandro Ghiani as The Sardinian Policeman
 Roberto Della Casa as Italian Commissioner
 Massimo Sarchielli as Spanish Commissioner
 Guido Cerniglia as Lawyer Pardini

See also 
 List of Italian films of 1982

References

External links 

1980s crime comedy films
Films directed by Carlo Vanzina
Films scored by Armando Trovajoli
Italian crime comedy films
1982 comedy films
1982 films
1980s Italian-language films
1980s Italian films